Lelia Foley (born November 7, 1942) was the first African American woman elected mayor in the United States.

Biography
In January 1973, Foley, a divorced mother of five, surviving on welfare, ran for a spot on the school board of Taft, Oklahoma, an all-black town of 600 people.  She lost the election, but shortly thereafter she became inspired by a book on the successful election of A. J. Cooper as mayor of Pritchard, Alabama.  Raising $200 from interested parties, she ran for the town’s top job.

On April 3, 1973, the citizens of Taft elected Foley as mayor. Her election pre-dates that of Doris A. Davis, who was elected mayor of Compton, California later that year.

In the wake of her victory, Foley conferred with Presidents Gerald Ford and Jimmy Carter.  In 1974, Oklahoma named Foley Outstanding Woman of the Year.

After losing her mayoral seat in the 1980s, she continued to serve her community.  In 2000, now known as Lelia Foley-Davis, she regained her position as mayor.  That same year, she ran unsuccessfully in the Democratic primary for an open seat in the Oklahoma House of Representatives in district 13 (when Democratic incumbent Bill Settle ran for Congress). Although she placed first in the initial primary with 35% of the vote, in the runoff, she lost to second-place finisher Allan Harder, 56-44% (Harder narrowly lost to Republican Stuart Ericson).

References

1942 births
Mayors of places in Oklahoma
People from Muskogee County, Oklahoma
Living people
African-American mayors in Oklahoma
African-American women in politics
Women mayors of places in Oklahoma
Oklahoma Democrats
21st-century African-American people
21st-century African-American women
20th-century African-American people
20th-century African-American women
African-American women mayors